Cult Energy Pro Cycling was a professional road bicycle racing team licensed in Denmark, that competed in the UCI Continental Circuits. It was established in 2000 under the name of "Cycling Horsens".

On October 10, 2014, the team announced they had signed Gustav Larsson on a one-year contract

In August 2015, the team seemed to secure its survival after gaining sponsorship from German company Stölting Group, which sponsored the Continental team Stölting in 2015. As a result, the teams planned to join forces, giving the necessary budget to ensure the team could stay in the Professional Continental tier for 2016. However, December 2015 Cult announced they would exit the sport and no longer be able to fund the team - as a result, Stölting stepped into the fill the funding void. As a result, the Danish team disbanded.

Team roster

Major wins

2004
Stage 10 Tour du Maroc, Max Nielsen
Stages 4 & 5 Tour of South China Sea, Max Nielsen
2005
Stage 5 Ringerike GP, Roy Hegreberg
2006
Stage 2 Tour of Siam, Jacob Nielsen
Stage 2 Ringerike GP, Haavard Nybø
Stage 5 Tour de Indonesia, Jacob Nielsen
2007
Stage 2 Tour of South China Sea, Morten Christiansen
Stages 3, 4 & 5 Tour of South China Sea, Kim Nielsen
2008
Stage 3 Istrian Spring Trophy, Kim Nielsen
2009
GP Bikebuster, Jacob Nielsen
2010
East Midlands Classic, Michael Berling
Overall Flèche du Sud, Lasse Bøchman
Stages 1 & 3 Festningsrittet, Troels Vinther
2011
Stage 2 Tour de Normandie, Thomas Kvist
Stage 1 Circuit des Ardennes, Troels Vinther
GP Herning, Troels Vinther
Stage 4 Rhône-Alpes Isère Tour, Thomas Kvist
Overall Flèche du Sud, Lasse Bøchman
Stage 3, Lasse Bøchman
2012
 Road Race Championships, Sebastian Lander
Stage 2 Circuit des Ardennes, André Steensen
Liège–Bastogne–Liège Espoirs, Michael Valgren
Himmerland Rundt, André Steensen
Stage 1 Flèche du Sud, André Steensen
Stage 5 Flèche du Sud, Patrick Clausen
Overall Kreiz Breizh Elites, André Steensen
Stages 1 & 2 (ITT), André Steensen
2013
Grand Prix de la ville de Nogent-sur-Oise, Alexander Kamp
Liège–Bastogne–Liège Espoirs, Michael Valgren
Skive–Løbet, Patrick Clausen
Overall Flèche du Sud, Michael Valgren
Stage 3, Michael Valgren
Stages 1 & 4 Danmark Rundt, Magnus Cort
2014
Dorpenomloop Rucphen, Michael Carbel
 Overall Istrian Spring Trophy, Magnus Cort
Stages 1 & 2, Magnus Cort
Stage 2 Circuit des Ardennes, Troels Vinther
Stage 2 Tour du Loir-et-Cher, Troels Vinther
Eschborn-Frankfurt City Loop U23, Mads Pedersen
Himmerland Rundt, Magnus Cort
Destination Thy, Magnus Cort
Ringerike GP, Magnus Cort
Stage 3 Tour des Fjords, Magnus Cort
 Overall Ronde de l'Oise, Magnus Cort
Stages 3 & 4, Magnus Cort
 Overall Czech Cycling Tour, Martin Mortensen
Stage 2, Martin Mortensen
Stage 1 Danmark Rundt, Magnus Cort
2015
 Overall Tour de Luxembourg, Linus Gerdemann
Stage 2, Linus Gerdemann
Velothon Wales, Martin Mortensen
 Time Trial Championships, Gustav Larsson

National champions
2012
 Denmark Road Race, Sebastian Lander
2015
 Sweden Time Trial, Gustav Larsson

References

External links
 

Cycling teams established in 2000
Cycling teams disestablished in 2015
Cycling teams based in Denmark
Defunct cycling teams based in Denmark
Former UCI Professional Continental teams